Vlad Rusu (born 22 June 1990, in Constanţa) is a Romanian footballer who plays as a striker for Viitorul Târgu Jiu.

Club career 
On 22 May 2009 Rusu played his first match in Steaua's shirt against FC Timișoara.
In July 2009 was sent to the second team.

In June 2011, Rusu left Steaua II.

References

 FC Viitorul l-a transferat pe Vlad Rusu‚ telegrafonline.ro, 7 January 2016

External links
 
 

1990 births
Living people
Sportspeople from Constanța
Romanian footballers
Association football forwards
Liga I players
Liga II players
FC Steaua București players
FC Steaua II București players
FC Viitorul Constanța players
LPS HD Clinceni players
FC Petrolul Ploiești players
CS Luceafărul Oradea players
ACS Viitorul Târgu Jiu players
AFC Turris-Oltul Turnu Măgurele players
Challenger Pro League players
K Beerschot VA players
Romanian expatriate footballers
Romanian expatriate sportspeople in Belgium
Expatriate footballers in Belgium